The Uppsala Mosque is a small but very frequented mosque located in the Kvarngärdet neighbourhood of Uppsala in Sweden. At the time of construction, it was mistakenly claimed to be the northernmost mosque in the world (Saint Petersburg was). It is still the northernmost mosque in Sweden.

There is another small mosque in Uppsala, located at Bandstolsvägen 28, near Gottsunda centrum. However, Friday Prayer doesn't get offered at this mosque.

History
On 1 January 2015, the mosque was attacked with a molotov cocktail.

See also
 Islam in Sweden

References

Mosques in Sweden
Mosque buildings with domes
Buildings and structures in Uppsala